Miles Thompson (born December 8, 1990) is an Iroquois professional lacrosse player who played for the University at Albany in NCAA Division I college lacrosse and plays for the Georgia Swarm in the National Lacrosse League and Chaos Lacrosse Club in the Premier Lacrosse League. He shared the 2014 Tewaaraton Trophy with his brother Lyle.

Early life
Miles grew up in the Onondaga Nation with parents Doloris and Jerome Thompson. He was one of five children in the family, which included brothers Jeremy, Lyle, and Jerome Jr. (Haina). Miles attended LaFayette High School, outside Syracuse, New York, and was a standout in their lacrosse program.

College
Miles attended the University at Albany, SUNY, where he played lacrosse with his brother Lyle and cousin Ty Thompson. The three Thompsons all played attack and scored 259 points in 2013. In 2014, Miles and Lyle were the first Native American players to win the Tewaaraton Trophy; tewaaraton is  the Mohawk term for the precursor of modern lacrosse. He finished at the University of Albany with 293 total points and holds an NCAA Record for scoring a goal in every game he played in.

Major League Lacrosse 
Miles Thompson was drafted in the third round, 20th overall, in the 2014 MLL Draft by the Rochester Rattlers. He was then traded to the Florida Launch and was on the active roster with them in their inaugural season. In 2015, the Launch selected Miles' brother Lyle first overall in the 2015 MLL Draft. The brothers' first game together was against the Ohio Machine.

National Lacrosse League 
Miles was drafted third overall in the 2014 NLL draft by the Minnesota Swarm. After his rookie season in Minnesota, the Swarm relocated to Georgia, becoming the Georgia Swarm. Thompson's younger brother Lyle was also drafted by the Swarm the next season, and older brother Jerome was acquired by the Swarm in 2016.

Premier Lacrosse League 
Thompson signed with the PLL and was selected to play for the Chaos Lacrosse Club prior to the PLL's inaugural season in 2019.

International competition 
As a player for the Iroquois men's national lacrosse team in the 2014 World Lacrosse Championship, Miles helped the Iroquois Nationals place third, their best-ever result in international field lacrosse competition.

Miles played for the Iroquois national indoor lacrosse team at the 2015 World Indoor Lacrosse Championship. The Iroquois won the silver medal, falling to Canada in the final match on September 27, 2015.

Miles again led the Iroquois to a 3rd place finish at the 2018 World Lacrosse Championship.

NLL career statistics

PLL career statistics

See also
2014 NCAA Division I Men's Lacrosse Championship
Albany Great Danes men's lacrosse
NCAA Lacrosse Records

References

External links 
 New York Times profile
 Baltimore Sun, "Albany's Lyle Thompson has become the face of college lacrosse"
 Lacrosse Magazine interview with Lyle Thompson
 
 https://thompsonbrotherslacrosse.us/

1990 births
Living people
Iroquois nations lacrosse players
Native American sportspeople
Albany Great Danes men's lacrosse players
Onondaga people
People from Onondaga County, New York
Native American people from New York (state)